Songthela is a spider genus in the family Liphistiidae with species found in China and Vietnam.

Species list
 it contains twenty-three species:

Songthela bristowei (Gertsch, 1967) — China
Songthela ciliensis (Yin, Tang & Xu, 2003) — China
Songthela goulouensis (Yin, 2001) — China
Songthela hangzhouensis (Chen, Zhang & Zhu, 1981) — China
Songthela huangyang Li, Liu, Li & Xu, 2020 — China
Songthela jianganensis (Chen, Gao, Zhu & Luo, 1988) — China
Songthela jinyun Chen, Liu, Li & Xu, 2022 — China
Songthela liui Chen, Li, Li & Xu, 2021 — China
Songthela longbao Chen, Liu, Li & Xu, 2022 — China
Songthela mangshan (Bao, Yin & Xu, 2003) — China
Songthela pluma Yu, Li & Zhang, 2018 — China
Songthela pyriformis Li, Liu & Xu, 2019 — China
Songthela sapana (Ono, 2010) — Vietnam
Songthela serriformis Chen, Liu, Li & Xu, 2022 — China
Songthela shei (Xu & Yin, 2001) — China
Songthela shuyuan Li, Liu & Xu, 2019 — China
Songthela tianzhu Chen, Li, Li & Xu, 2021 — China
Songthela wangerbao Chen, Liu, Li & Xu, 2022 — China
Songthela wosanensis (Wang & Jiao, 1995) — China
Songthela xiangnan Li, Liu, Li & Xu, 2020 — China
Songthela xianningensis (Yin, Tang, Zhao & Chen, 2002) — China
Songthela yunnanensis (Song & Haupt, 1984) — China
Songthela yuping Chen, Li, Li & Xu, 2021 — China

See also
 List of Liphistiidae species

References

External links

Liphistiidae
Mesothelae genera
Spiders of China